KTNT may refer to:
 KIRO-FM, a radio station in Seattle, Washington, United States which held the call sign KTNT-FM in Tacoma, Washington from 1948 to 1972.
 KITZ-AM, a radio station in Silverdale, Washington which held the call sign KTNT-AM from 1948 to 1983 & was licensed to Tacoma, Washington. 
 KTNT (FM), a radio station (102.5 FM) licensed to Eufaula, Oklahoma, United States
 KSTW-TV, a CW O&O station (channel 11 analog/36 digital) licensed to Tacoma, Washington and serving the Seattle-Tacoma market, which held the call sign KTNT-TV from 1953 to 1974
 XENT-AM, a radio station (790 AM) licensed to La Paz, Baja California Sur, Mexico, a successor to a station XENT in Nuevo Laredo, Tamaulipas, active 1933–1941, again a successor to KTNT in Muscatine, Iowa active 1925–1931. The historical KTNT and XENT belonged to the controversial radio personality Norman G. Baker.
 Dade-Collier Training and Transition Airport (ICAO code KTNT)